Ulan-Burgas (from улаан - "red", and бургааһан, "small birch" or "shrub"), is a mountain range in Buryatia, Russia. 

The range is located close to Ulan-Ude, the capital of Buryatia.

Geography  
The Ulan-Burgas range is located in Central Buryatia. The highest peak is Khurkhag at  located in the central part. 

The northeastern end of the Ulan-Burgas connects with the Ikat Range and the eastern and southern ends are part of the Selenga Highlands. At one end of the range is the valley of the Turka River that flows into Lake Baikal and at the other end the Kurba, a right tributary of the Uda from the Selenga River basin.

Flora
The higher elevations are topped by "golets" type bare summits.

See also
South Siberian Mountains

References

External links

Mountain ranges of Russia
Landforms of Siberia
Landforms of Buryatia
South Siberian Mountains